Anna Maria Brizio (1902-1982) was professor of art history at the University of Milan, a member of the Commissione Vinciana and an authority on the work of Leonardo da Vinci.

Selected publications

Italian
 Per il quarto centenario dalla nascita di Paolo Caliari detto Paolo Veronese. Note per una definizione critica dello stile di Paolo Veronese, in «L'arte. Rivista bimestrale di storia dell'arte medioevale e moderna», 31 (1928), fasc. 1
 Un'opera giovanile del Botticelli, in «L'arte. Rivista bimestrale di storia dell'arte medioevale e moderna», marzo 1933, fasc. 2, pp. 108–119
 Per il quinto centenario Verrocchiesco (1435-1935), in «Emporium», dicembre 1935, pp. 293–303
 Vercelli. Catalogo delle cose d'arte e d'antichità d'Italia, Roma 1935
 Ottocento, Novecento, Unione tipografico-editrice torinese, Torino 1939 (costituisce il vol. 6 della Storia dell'arte classica e italiana; ristampato a più riprese fino al 1962)
 Nota bibliografica degli studi italiani recenti su argomenti di pittura spagnola e italo-spagnola, in Italia e Spagna. Saggi sui rapporti storici, filosofici ed artistici tra le due civiltà, a cura dell'Istituto Nazionale per le relazioni culturali con l'estero, Le Monnier, Firenze, 1941
 La pittura in Piemonte dall'età romanica al Cinquecento, G.B. Paravia, Torino 1942
  Vite scelte di Giorgio Vasari, a cura di Anna Maria Brizio, Unione tipografico-editrice torinese, Torino 1948 (e successive ristampe, fino al 1996)
 Scritti scelti di Leonardo da Vinci, a cura di Anna Maria Brizio, Unione tipografico-editrice torinese, Torino 1952 (e successive ristampe, fino al 2000)
 Correlazioni e rispondenze tra fogli del Codice atlantico e fogli dell'anatomia B e dei codici A e C su l'occhio, la prospettiva, le piramidi radiose e le ombre, in «Raccolta Vinciana», fasc. 17 (1954), pp. 82–89
 Il Trattato della pittura di Leonardo, De Luca, Roma 1956
 I manoscritti di Leonardo da Vinci nella Biblioteca nacional di Madrid, Akademiai Kiado, Budapest 19..!, pp. 725–734
 Disegni di Carlo Francesco Nuvolone alla Biblioteca Ambrosiana, A. Nicola, Milano - Varese 1959
 Manierismo. Rinascimento, in «Bollettino del Centro internazionale di studi d'architettura A. Palladio», 9 (1967), pp. 219–226
 Rassegna degli studi vinciani dal 1952 al 1968, in [?], 1968, pp. 107–120
 Bramante e Leonardo alla corte di Ludovico il Moro, De Luca Editore, 1970
 Il Codice di Leonardo da Vinci nella Biblioteca Trivulziana di Milano. Trascrizione diplomatica e critica, Giunti-Barbèra, Firenze 1980
 Attualità leonardiane, in «L'Almanacco italiano», v. 81 (1981) e v. 82 (1982).

English
 Leonardo the Scientist. McGraw-Hill, New York, 1980. (With Carlo Zammattio and Augusto Marinoni)

References 

Italian art historians
Women art historians
Academic staff of the University of Turin
Leonardo da Vinci scholars
Academic staff of the University of Milan
20th-century Italian women writers
20th-century Italian historians
Italian women historians
1902 births
1982 deaths